Masih is Arabic for 'Christ' or 'Messiah'. Christians, Muslims and members of related religions use Masih as a religious title for Jesus of Nazareth.

Also spelled Mesih or Maseeh, it is used as a proper name in many languages. The term also appears in the Christian name Abdul Masih ("Servant of Christ").

Historical 
 Dionysius bar Masih (died 1204), leader of the Syriac Orthodox Church
 Mesih Pasha (died 1501), Ottoman Grand Admiral and later Grand Vizier
 Mesihi of Prishtina ( 1470–1512), Ottoman poet
 Hadim Mesih Pasha (died 1589), Ottoman Grand Vizier

Given name
 Bir Masih Saunta (born 1969), Indian politician
 Masih Alinejad (born 1976), Iranian journalist and writer
 Masih Masihnia (born 1955), Iranian football player
 Masih Saighani (born 1986), Afghan football player
 Masih Ullah Barakzai, Afghan football player
 Masih Zahedi (born 1993), Iranian football player
 Muhammad Masihullah Khan (1911/1912–1992), Indian Deobandi Islamic scholar

Surname

 Akram Masih Gill, Pakistani politician
 Arif Masih, (born 1970) Pakistani politician
 Fariborz Maseeh, Iranian-American engineer
 Ijaz Masih, Pakistani politician
 Iqbal Masih (1983–1995), Pakistani boy who became a symbol of abusive child labour in the developing world
 Michael Masih (born 1985), Pakistani football player
 Naeem Masih (born 1987), Pakistani para-athlete 
 Rakesh Masih (born 1987), Indian football player 
 Shazia Masih (1997–2010), Pakistani torture victim

Other uses
 Jai Masih Ki, a greeting phrase used by Christians in India and Pakistan
 Maseeh College of Engineering and Computer Science, engineering college in Portland State University